Diane M. Jardine Bruce (born June 1956) is the Bishop Provisional of the Episcopal Diocese of West Missouri. She previously served as the seventh bishop suffragan of the Episcopal Diocese of Los Angeles.

Early life and education
Diane was born in June 1956 in Pequannock, New Jersey. She was raised as a Roman Catholic. She studied at the University of California, Berkeley and graduated with a Bachelor of Arts in linguistics in 1979. In 1980 she commenced employment with Wells Fargo Bank and subsequently served as vice president, in compensation management, and in analysis. It was in 1986 that she joined the Episcopal Church. She then earned a Master of Divinity from Claremont School of Theology in 1997. She also has a Doctor of Ministry from Seabury-Western Theological Seminary in Congregational Development in process.

Ordained Ministry
Diane was ordained deacon in June 1997 by the Assistant Bishop of Los Angeles Robert Marshall Anderson, and then priest on January 7, 1998 by the Bishop of Los Angeles Frederick H. Borsch. Between 1997 and 200 she was associate rector of the Church of the Messiah in Santa Ana, California where she was responsible for Women’s ministry and youth group. Between 2000 and 2010 she was rector of St Clement’s by-the-Sea Church in San Clemente, California.

Episcopacy
Diane was elected Suffragan Bishop of Los Angeles on December 4, 2009. She was consecrated as a bishop on May 15, 2010 by Presiding Bishop Katharine Jefferts Schori. She retained the post until her election on November 6, 2021, as the Provisional Bishop of the Diocese of West Missouri by the diocesan convention meeting at Grace and Holy Trinity Cathedral in Kansas City, Missouri. Upon the completion of her ministry in the Diocese of Los Angeles, Bruce took up residence and began her ministry in the Diocese of West Missouri on December 1, 2021. She is married to Gregory Stephen Bruce and is the mother of two.

See also
 List of Episcopal bishops of the United States
 Historical list of the Episcopal bishops of the United States

References

Living people
Women Anglican bishops
1956 births
Place of birth missing (living people)
Date of birth missing (living people)
Episcopal bishops of West Missouri
Episcopal bishops of Los Angeles
Converts to Anglicanism from Roman Catholicism